Indian Nursing Council is a national regulatory body for nurses and nurse education in India. It is an autonomous body under the Government of India, Ministry of Health & Family Welfare, constituted by the Central Government under section 3(1) of the Indian Nursing Council Act, 1947 of Indian parliament.
According to the original act the function of the council is to provide "uniformity in nursing education".

Functions  

 Recognition of nursing qualifications in India.(10.1)
 Granting any nursing qualification: Grants a qualification in general nursing, midwifery, health visiting or public health nursing.(10.2)
 The Council may enter into negotiations with any authority [in any territory of India to which this Act does not extend or foreign country] which by the law of such territory or country is entrusted with the maintenance of a register of nurses midwives or health visitors; for the settling of a scheme of reciprocity for the recognition of nursing qualifications.(10.3)
 Indian Nursing Council has the Power to require information as to courses of study and training and examinations.(12)
 Inspect any institution recognized as a training institution, and to attend examinations held for the purpose of granting any recognized qualification or recognized higher qualification in India.(13)
 Withdrawal of recognition (14): The council may withdraw the recognition an institution recognized by a State Council for the training of nurses, midwives or health visitors does not satisfy the requirements of the Council.
 Power to make regulations (16): The Council may make regulations not inconsistent with the Indian Nursing Council Act generally to carry out the provisions of this Act, and in particular and without prejudice to the generality of the foregoing powers.

State-level nursing councils 

There are many registered state-level nursing councils. They are granted autonomous rights by the nursing council.

See also
 Auxiliary Nurse Midwife (ANM)
 Nursing in India

References

External links
Official website

Medical and health organisations based in India
Nursing in India
Nursing councils in India
Organisations based in Delhi
Organizations established in 1947
Government agencies established in 1947
1947 establishments in India
Ministry of Health and Family Welfare